The 2011–12 Welsh Alliance League, known as the Lock Stock Welsh Alliance League for sponsorship reasons, is the 28th season of the Welsh Alliance League, which consists of two divisions: the third and fourth levels of the Welsh football pyramid.

There are sixteen teams in Division 1 and twelve teams in Division 2, with the champions of Division 1 promoted to the Cymru Alliance and the bottom two teams relegated to Division 2. In Division 2, the champions, and runners-up are promoted to Division 1.

The season began on 13 August 2011 and concluded on 8 May 2012 with Holyhead Hotspur as Division 1 champions, Llanfairpwll and Caernarfon Wanderers, who folded at the start of the 2012–13 season, were relegated to Division 2. In Division 2, Glantraeth were champions with Llanberis as runners-up.

Division 1

Teams 
Conwy United were champions in the previous season and were promoted to the Cymru Alliance.

Llanberis were relegated and replaced by Division 2 champions, Caernarfon Wanderers and runners-up, Bodedern Athletic, who were promoted to Division 1.

Grounds and locations

League table

Results

Division 2

Teams 
Caernarfon Wanderers were champions in the previous season and were promoted to Division 1 along with runners-up, Bodedern Athletic. They were replaced by Gwynedd League champions, Glantraeth who were promoted to Division 2.

Grounds and locations

League table

Results

References

External links
 Welsh Alliance League

Welsh Alliance League seasons
3
Wales